Bible paper, also known as scritta paper, is a thin grade of paper used for printing books which have many pages, such as a dictionary. Technically, Bible paper is a type of woodfree uncoated paper. This paper grade often contains cotton or linen fibres to increase its strength in spite of its thinness.

It is used for making Bibles, encyclopedias and dictionaries; as well as some fiction books, such as the ones published by the Bibliothèque de la Pléiade. The Norton Anthology of English Literature is also known for using Bible paper (an essayist from The New York Times referred to it as "wispy cigarette paper").

References 

"Bible paper" in Matt T. Roberts and Don Etherington, Bookbinding and the Conservation of books: A Dictionary of Descriptive Terminology.

See also
India paper

Paper
Paper